The 2012–13 A.C. ChievoVerona season was the club's fifth consecutive season in Serie A.

Players

Out on loan

Matches

Legend

Serie A

League table

Results summary

Results by round

Matches

Coppa Italia

Statistics

Appearances and goals

|-
! colspan="10" style="background:#dcdcdc; text-align:center"| Goalkeepers

|-
! colspan="10" style="background:#dcdcdc; text-align:center"| Defenders

|-
! colspan="10" style="background:#dcdcdc; text-align:center"| Midfielders

|-
! colspan="10" style="background:#dcdcdc; text-align:center"| Forwards

|-
! colspan="10" style="background:#dcdcdc; text-align:center"| Players transferred out during the season

Top scorers
This includes all competitive matches.  The list is sorted by shirt number when total goals are equal.
{| class="wikitable sortable" style="font-size: 95%; text-align: center;"
|-
!width=15|
!width=15|
!width=15|
!width=15|
!width=150|Name
!width=80|Serie A
!width=80|Coppa Italia
!width=80|Total
|-
|1
|77
|FW
|
|Cyril Théréau
|11
|2
|13
|-
|2
|43
|FW
|
|Alberto Paloschi
|7
|0
|7
|-
|3
|31
|FW
|
|Sergio Pellissier
|5
|1
|6
|-
|4
|39
|MF
|
|Adrian Stoian
|3
|0
|3
|-
|5
|3
|DF
|
|Marco Andreolli
|2
|0
|2
|-
|=
|14
|MF
|
|Isaac Cofie
|2
|0
|2
|-
|=
|17
|FW
|
|David Di Michele
|1
|1
|2
|-
|8
|6
|MF
|
|Marco Rigoni
|1
|0
|1
|-
|=
|8
|MF
|
|Rinaldo Cruzado
|1
|0
|1
|-
|=
|10
|MF
|
|Luciano
|1
|0
|1
|-
|=
|16
|MF
|
|Luca Rigoni
|1
|0
|1
|-
|=
|33
|DF
|
|Paul Papp
|1
|0
|1
|-
|=
|93
|DF
|
|Boukary Dramé
|1
|0
|1

Sources

Chievo
A.C. ChievoVerona seasons